Wavelight is a pace-setting system using a series of LED lights on the inside of an athletics track developed by Robotronix Europe and Sport Technologies. It has been allowed to use in competition by World Athletics since 2020, citing benefits to pacing and the spectator experience. The system has generated controversy as an unfair advantage not offered to historical athletes, after being used to set multiple new world records. Standalone variants are also available for personal, recreational, and amateur use.

References 

Sports technology